Giannis Arabatzis (born 28 May 1984) is a Greek professional footballer who played as a goalkeeper.

Career

AEK Athens
Arabatzis made his first cap against rival team Panathinaikos, and impressed the fans and coach Dusan Bajevic. After his impressive performances, Arabatzis has earned himself a spot in the AEK starting line-up after five years on the bench forcing Sebastian Saja as second choice. In 2011, he was the first choice for the position of goalkeeper, leaving Dimitrios Konstantopoulos out of the first eleven. Moreover, he was given the MVP award for his performance against Ergotelis. After the departure of Nikos Georgeas, Arabatzis became the eldest player of the team having completed ten years in the team.

At the end of 2012–13 season AEK Athens  relegated to the third division, and his contract with AEK expired on 30 June 2013.

Ermis Aradippou
On 21 August 2013, Arabatzis sign one-year deal with Ermis Aradippou to Cypriot First Division. That season Ermis Aradippou had been promoted to Cypriot First Division and Giannis had helped the team to took part in UEFA Europa League Play-Offs.

Astra Giurgiu
On 23 July 2014, Arabatzis signed a one-year contract with Astra Giurgiu.

Kerkyra
After an unstable season in Romania, Arabatzis signed one-year contract with Kerkyra in Football League (Greece Second Division). After some attractive performances Arabatzis helped Kerkyra to promotion in Superleague and Kerkyra renew his contract for one-year.

Second Spell to Ermis Aradippou
On 15 September 2017, he returned to his former club Ermis Aradippou.

Agios Nikolaos
On 29 October 2019, Arabatzis joined Agios Nikolaos.

Career statistics

Club

Honours
AEK Athens
Greek Cup: 2010–11

References

External links
 Guardian Football
 
 

1984 births
Living people
Greek footballers
Greece youth international footballers
Association football goalkeepers
Greek expatriate footballers
AEK Athens F.C. players
Ermis Aradippou FC players
FC Astra Giurgiu players
PAE Kerkyra players
Cypriot First Division players
Super League Greece players
Liga I players
Expatriate footballers in Romania
Expatriate footballers in Cyprus
Greek expatriate sportspeople in Romania
Greek expatriate sportspeople in Cyprus
Agios Nikolaos F.C. players
People from Imathia
Footballers from Central Macedonia